Scrooby is a small village on the River Ryton in north Nottinghamshire, England, near Bawtry in South Yorkshire. At the time of the 2001 census it had a population of 329. Until 1766, it was on the Great North Road so became a stopping-off point for numerous important figures including Queen Elizabeth I and Cardinal Wolsey on their journeys. The latter stayed at the Manor House briefly, after his fall from favour.

In 958, King Edgar granted an estate including land at Scroppenþorpe, including an area now in the modern Scrooby, to Oscytel, Archbishop of York. The Manor House belonged to the Archbishops of York and so was sometimes referred to as a palace. (A nearby former farmhouse is still called Palace Farm.) At the end of the sixteenth century, the house was occupied by William Brewster, the Archbishop's bailiff, who was also postmaster. His son, also named William, took that post in the 1590s after a job as an assistant to the Secretary of State under Queen Elizabeth I. The junior William became dissatisfied with the Anglican Church as it was developing at the time, acquired Brownist beliefs and attempted to leave for the Netherlands in 1607. After an unsuccessful first attempt, Brewster succeeded in 1608.  He eventually went to New England in 1620 on the Mayflower, as one of the people later called Pilgrim Fathers.  The Manor House was demolished early in the 19th century, though the levelled area where it stood can still be made out, as can the twin sets of steps (now just grassy banks) that led down to the ornamental ponds.   All that remain are a cottage (perhaps intended for a resident official and not open to the public, though it has commemorative plaques), a substantial brick dovecote and the fishponds. Notice boards direct visitors to the best places to view the historic sites which today are private property.

The parish church of St Wilfrid has an octagonal spire. Other buildings of interest are the remaining buildings on the site of the former manor house, the mill, the old vicarage, the village's historic farmhouses, and the pinfold. The village stocks were sold to America, more than a hundred years ago.

Just north of Scrooby, the road that links the A638 and the A614 is called Gibbet Hill Lane. This lane is so named after a brutal crime that took place early in the morning of 3 July 1779 when John Spencer, who had been playing cards with Scrooby's toll-bar keeper, William Yeadon, and his mother (then on a visit), returned to the tollhouse and killed both of them. The crime was enacted for the purposes of robbery, and Spencer gained re-admittance under a pretence that a drove of cattle wished to pass that way. Spencer was interrupted by travellers in the act of dragging one body across the road towards the River Ryton, and arrested shortly thereafter by a search party. He was executed following a trial at Nottingham Assizes, and his body afterwards hung in a gibbet cage on a slope south of the Ryton now denominated Gibbet Hill.

Places of Worship
St Wilfrid's Church is a Grade II* listed Church of England parish church.

See also
 Scrooby Congregation — Protestant separatists who migrated from Scrooby to the Netherlands in 1607/08

References

External links

 Scrooby village history and information

 
Villages in Nottinghamshire
Civil parishes in Nottinghamshire
Bassetlaw District